The Mediterranean Biogeographic Region is the biogeographic region around and including the Mediterranean Sea.
The term is defined by the European Environment Agency as applying to the land areas of Europe that border on the Mediterranean Sea, and the corresponding territorial waters.
The region is rich in biodiversity and has many endemic species.
The term may also be used in the broader sense of all the lands of the Mediterranean Basin, or in the narrow sense of just the Mediterranean Sea.

Extent

The European Commission defines the Mediterranean Biogeographic Region as consisting of the Mediterranean Sea, Greece, Malta, Cyprus, large parts of Portugal, Spain and Italy, and a smaller part of France.
The region includes 20.6% of European Union territory.

Climate

The region has cool humid winters and hot dry summers.
The region may also be subdivided into dry zones such as Alicante in Spain, and humid zones such as Cinque Terre in Italy.

Terrain

The region has generally hilly terrain and includes islands, high mountains, semi-arid steppes and thick Mediterranean forests, woodlands, and scrub with many aromatic plants. 
There are rocky shorelines and sandy beaches.
The region has been greatly affected by human activity such as livestock grazing, cultivation, forest clearance and forest fires. 
In recent years tourism has put greater pressure on the shoreline environment.

Biodiversity

The Mediterranean Biogeographic Region is rich in biodiversity and has many endemic species.
The region has more plants species than all the other biogeographical regions of Europe combined.
The wildlife and vegetation are adapted to the unpredictable weather, with sudden downpours or strong winds.
Coastal wetlands are home to endemic species of insects, amphibians and fish, which provide food for large flocks of waders and dabbling ducks.
The sea is also rich in marine life, including many endemic species.
The shallow coastal waters hold huge Posidonia beds, underwater meadows that harbor rare crustaceans, sponges and Ascidiacea (sea squirts).
As of 2009 the region was not sufficiently covered in the EuMon database.
Recruiting volunteers to monitor species may help address the issue.

The Iberian Peninsula is particularly rich in species, including rare and endemic species, due to its complex climate and terrain, and because it provided refugia during the glacial period of the Pleistocene.
A 2011 study of spiders in the coastal dunes of Portugal showed that the primary factor in beta diversity was a broad-scale gradient of mediterraneity.
Diversity was lower in the northern dunes, which are in the Eurosiberian biogeographic region, and higher in the center and south in the Mediterranean  biogeographic region

Related concepts

Mediterranean Basin

Arco Aguilar and Rodríguez Delgado state that three large floristic regions originated in the Mesogean region after the Pleistocene glaciation, the Mediterranean, Saharo-North-Arabian and Iranian-Turanian.
Academics such as Ana Isabel Queiroz and Simon Pooley consider that the Mediterranean biogeographic region includes all of the Mediterranean Sea and all the lands surrounding it that have a Mediterranean-type climate (MTC).

The region contains about 1.6% of the world's dry land but has about 10% of the known vascular plant species, with over 25,000 identified to date.
More than half of them are endemic.

The biogeographic origins of the non-indigenous plants of the region include northern and central Eurasia, southwest and central Asia, North Africa, Arabia and the tropics of Africa.
For example, the Mediterranean species of the Androcymbium genus migrated northward from tropical Africa via the Eastern African mountain ranges to reach the Mediterranean in the Middle Miocene, at a time when the climate was quite different from today.
Molecular phylogeography is starting to give new insights into the origins and evolution of Mediterranean species.

Mediterranean Sea

An analysis of literature has found about 17,000 marine species recorded as occurring in the Mediterranean Sea.
This estimate is probably low, with microbes significantly under-reported, and with large gaps in knowledge of the deep sea areas and the southern and eastern part of the sea.
Biodiversity is generally greater in the coastal and shallow regions, lower in deeper areas.
The ecology is threatened by habitat loss or degradation from fishing, pollution, climate change, eutrophication and alien species.

Notes

Citations

Sources

Mediterranean Sea
Biogeography